Nikolay Abramov may refer to:

 Nikolay Abramov (athlete) (born 1933), Soviet Olympic runner
 Nikolay Abramov (footballer, born 1950) (1950–2005), Soviet footballer
 Nikolay Abramov (footballer, born 1984) (1984–2011), Russian footballer
 Nikolay Abramov (writer) (1961–2016), Russian Vepsian writer